Loizos Kakoyiannis (born May 2, 1981, in Cyprus) is a Cypriot football defender, who currently plays for Enosis Neon Parekklisia. He started his professional career from Apollon Limassol and then he played also for Ethnikos Achnas, Omonia Nicosia, AEL Limassol, AEP Paphos, Aris Limassol, P.A.O. Krousona, Karmiotissa and Akritas Chlorakas.

Career
After impressing at Ethnikos Achnas he moved to AC Omonia, AEL Limassol has tried several times to buy this player when he was at Ethnikos Achnas but finally managed to apply him to the roster at the season 2008/2009. He has played good in the first season and in the season 2009/2010 he struggled to start in the starting eleven. But when he was given the opportunity he impressed his coach, and even scored the winning goal at the 85' minute.

External links
 
 Profile at aelfc.com
 

1981 births
Living people
Cypriot footballers
Cyprus international footballers
Cypriot First Division players
AEL Limassol players
AC Omonia players
Apollon Limassol FC players
Association football defenders
Karmiotissa FC players
Akritas Chlorakas players
Enosis Neon Parekklisia FC players